The 2002 First-Year Player Draft, Major League Baseball's annual amateur draft, was held on June 4 and 5.

It is featured in Michael Lewis' 2003 book Moneyball.

First round selections

Supplemental first round compensation selections

 *Did Not Sign With Team

Compensation picks

Background
The Pittsburgh Pirates selected 21-year-old right-handed pitcher Bryan Bullington with the first overall pick in the 2002 First-Year Player Draft. The 6'5", 225-pound hurler was ranked by Baseball America as having the best breaking ball and best command among all college pitchers. 

In his three-year career at Ball State, Bullington posted a 29–11 record, 13 complete games and a 3.36 ERA in 46 games (42 starts). He is the university's all-time leader in strikeouts (357) and was a member of the 2001 USA National team. As a freshman, Bullington garnered all-conference honors and led the MAC in strikeouts. He was also named MAC Pitcher-of-the-Year for 2001 and 2002. Bullington set a MAC record in strikeouts and led the league in victories and ERA in 2002. 

Other notable selections in the first round included Prince Fielder (Brewers), son of former Major Leaguer Cecil Fielder; and John Mayberry Jr. (Mariners), son of former Major Leaguer John Mayberry.

This draft was discussed at length in the Michael Lewis book Moneyball: The Art of Winning an Unfair Game, which analyzed Oakland Athletics general manager Billy Beane's approach to player scouting and development.

Other notable players

Joey Votto, 2nd round, 44th overall by the Cincinnati Reds
Micah Owings, 2nd round, 50th overall by the Colorado Rockies
Jon Lester, 2nd round, 57th overall by the Boston Red Sox
Jonathan Broxton, 2nd round, 60th overall by the Los Angeles Dodgers
Jesse Crain, 2nd round, 61st overall by the Minnesota Twins
Brian McCann, 2nd round, 64th overall by the Atlanta Braves
Fred Lewis, 2nd round, 66th overall by the San Francisco Giants
Chris Snyder, 2nd round, 68th overall by the Arizona Diamondbacks
Curtis Granderson, 3rd round, 80th overall by the Detroit Tigers
Charlie Morton, 3rd round, 95th overall by the Atlanta Braves
Jeff Baker, 4th round, 111th overall by the Colorado Rockies
Rich Hill, 4th round, 112th overall by the Chicago Cubs
Josh Johnson, 4th round, 113th overall by the Florida Marlins
Kevin Correia, 4th round, 127th overall by the San Francisco Giants
Nick Hundley, 5th round, 143rd overall by the Florida Marlins, but did not sign
Ben Francisco, 5th round, 154th overall by the Cleveland Indians
John Maine, 6th round, 166th overall by the Baltimore Orioles
Scott Olsen, 6th round, 173rd overall by the Florida Marlins
Chris Getz, 6th round, 180th overall by the Chicago White Sox
Pat Neshek, 6th round, 182nd overall by the Minnesota Twins
Matt Capps, 7th round, 193rd overall by the Pittsburgh Pirates
Tom Wilhelmsen, 7th round, 199th overall by the Milwaukee Brewers
Ryan Spilborghs, 7th round, 201st overall by the Colorado Rockies
Brandon Moss, 8th round, 238th overall by the Boston Red Sox
Adam Lind, 8th round, 242nd overall by the Minnesota Twins, but did not sign
Clay Hensley, 8th round, 247th overall by the San Francisco Giants
Jared Burton, 8th round, 248th overall by the Oakland Athletics
Adam Greenberg, 9th round, 273rd overall by the Chicago Cubs
Jason Hammel, 10th round, 284th overall by the Tampa Bay Devil Rays
Howie Kendrick, 10th round, 294th overall by the Anaheim Angels
Matt Lindstrom, 10th round, 297th overall by the New York Mets
Joel Zumaya, 11th round, 320th overall by the Detroit Tigers
James McDonald, 11th round, 331st overall by the Los Angeles Dodgers
John Schneider, 13th round, 386th overall by the Toronto Blue Jays
Micah Hoffpauir, 13th round, 393rd overall by the Chicago Cubs
Mike Pelfrey, 15th round, 434th overall by the Tampa Bay Devil Rays, but did not sign
Gaby Sánchez, 15th round, 460th overall by the Tampa Bay Devil Rays, but did not sign
Brandon McCarthy, 17th round, 510th overall by the Chicago White Sox
Russell Martin, 17th round, 511th overall by the Los Angeles Dodgers
Chris Young, 18th round, 531st overall by the Colorado Rockies
Chris Denorfia, 19th round, 555th overall by the Cincinnati Reds
Kameron Loe, 20th round, 592nd overall by the Texas Rangers
George Kottaras, 20th round, 595th overall by the San Diego Padres
Boone Logan, 20th round, 600th overall by the Chicago White Sox
Andy LaRoche, 21st round, 625th overall by the San Diego Padres, but did not sign
Travis Ishikawa, 21st round, 637th overall by the San Francisco Giants
Jacoby Ellsbury, 23rd round, 674th overall by the Tampa Bay Rays, but did not sign
Kyle McClellan, 25th round, 762nd overall by the St. Louis Cardinals
Craig Breslow, 26th round, 769th overall by the Milwaukee Brewers
Phil Coke, 26th round, 786th overall by the New York Yankees
Brad Ziegler, 31st round, 938th overall by the Oakland Athletics, but did not sign
Nyjer Morgan, 33rd round, 973rd overall by the Pittsburgh Pirates
Tony Sipp, 33rd round, 990th overall by the Chicago White Sox, but did not sign
Ricky Romero, 37th round, 1108th overall by the Boston Red Sox, but did not sign
Randy Wells, 38th round, 1143rd overall by the Chicago Cubs
Luke Hochevar, 39th round, 1171st overall by the Los Angeles Dodgers, but did not sign
Bryan LaHair, 39th round, 1180th overall by the Seattle Mariners
Hunter Pence, 40th round, 1189th overall by the Milwaukee Brewers, but did not sign
Matt Garza, 40th round, 1191st overall by the Colorado Rockies, but did not sign
Jonathan Papelbon, 40th round, 1208th overall by the Oakland Athletics, but did not sign
Scott Feldman, 41st round, 1241st overall by the Houston Astros, but did not sign
Brian Bannister, 45th round, 1342nd overall by the Boston Red Sox, but did not sign

NFL players drafted
Brandon Weeden, 2nd round, 71st overall by the New York Yankees
Brandon Jones, 42nd round, 1,270 overall by the Seattle Mariners, but did not sign
John Stocco, 45th round, 1,346th overall by the Minnesota Twins, but did not sign

References

External links
MLB.com - 2002 Draft page
MLB.com - Draft History
Complete draft list from The Baseball Cube database

Major League Baseball draft
Draft
Major League Baseball draft